Sunbury—Queen's was a federal electoral district in New Brunswick, Canada, that was represented in the House of Commons of Canada from 1896 to 1917.

This riding was created in 1892 from the ridings of Queen's and Sunbury.  It consisted of the counties of Sunbury and Queen's. It was abolished in 1914 when it was redistributed into Royal and York—Sunbury ridings.

Members of Parliament

This riding elected the  following Members of Parliament:

Election results

By-election: Mr. King resigned, summoned to the Senate, 18 December 1896

See also 

 List of Canadian federal electoral districts
 Past Canadian electoral districts

External links 
Riding history from the Library of Parliament

Former federal electoral districts of New Brunswick